The 1851 New South Wales colonial election, was held between 12 and 25 September. It involved a re-distribution of electorates as a result of the separation of Victoria, which had 6 seats in the previous council, and the expansion of the council from 24 elected members to 36 elected members representing 31 electorates. The major changes were the addition of 8 pastoral districts and the separate representation for the northern regions of what would later become Queensland. These had previously been a part of the single district of Gloucester, Macquarie, and Stanley and from 1851 were covered by the separate districts of Stanley, Stanley Boroughs and the pastoral districts of Moreton, Wide Bay, Burnett, and Maranoa. The other 8 additional seats were distributed among the nineteen counties of New South Wales.

In 14 out of 31 districts the candidate was elected unopposed, including all eight pastoral districts, which were seen as representing the interests of squatters.

In 1856 the unicameral Legislative Council was abolished and replaced with an elected Legislative Assembly and an appointed Legislative Council.

There would not be another general election for the Legislative Council until 1978.

Results by district

Argyle

Bathurst

Eastern Camden

Western Camden

Clarence and Darling Downs

Cook and Westmoreland

Cumberland
Two members to be elected

Cumberland Boroughs

Durham
Two members to be elected

Gloucester and Macquarie

King and Georgiana

Lachlan and Lower Darling

Liverpool Plains and Gwydir

Maneroo

Moreton, Wide Bay, Burnett, and Maranoa

Murray and St Vincent

Murrumbidgee

New England and Macleay

North Eastern Boroughs

Northumberland and Hunter
Two members to be elected

Northumberland Boroughs

Parramatta

Phillip, Brisbane and Bligh

Roxburgh and Wellington

Southern Boroughs

Stanley Boroughs

Stanley

City of Sydney
Three members to be elected

Sydney Hamlets

Wellington and Bligh

Western Boroughs

References

1851